Alejandro Raúl Spajić Torres (born May 7, 1976) is an Argentine volleyball player. Spajić is clearly a volleyball player both for Argentina and his club. His background is somewhat similar to another world-class volleyball player namely Marcos Milinkovic.

Alejandro Spajić's parents are immigrants of Croat origin.
With the professional club Lokomotiv Belgorod, he won the bronze medal at the 2004–05 CEV Champions League and was awarded "Best Spiker".

Clubs
  Obras San Juan (1993–2000)
  Stade Poitevin Volley-Ball Poitiers (2000–2002)
  Obras San Juan (2002–2003)
  Bolívar Buenos Aires  (2003–2004)
  Lokomotiv Belgorod (2004–2006)
  Drean Bolívar (2009–2010)
  Union de Formosa (2011-actualidad)

Awards

Individuals
 2004–05 CEV Champions League "Best Spiker"

Clubs
 1995 Argentine Championship –  Champion, with Obras San Juan
 2001 Argentine Cup –  Champion, with Obras San Juan
 2003 Argentine Championship –  Champion, with Obras San Juan
 2004–05 CEV Champions League –  Bronze Medal, with Lokomotiv Belgorod
 2005 Russian Championship –  Champion, with Lokomotiv Belgorod
 2006 Russian Cup –  Champion, with Lokomotiv Belgorod

References

External links
 FIVB Profile

1976 births
Living people
People from San Juan, Argentina
Argentine men's volleyball players
Argentine people of Croatian descent
Volleyball players at the 2000 Summer Olympics
Volleyball players at the 2004 Summer Olympics
Olympic volleyball players of Argentina
Sportspeople from San Juan Province, Argentina
Argentine expatriate sportspeople in France
Argentine expatriate sportspeople in Russia